FC Fetrovyk Khust is a Ukrainian amateur football club from Khust, Zakarpattia Oblast. The club used to be named as Andezyt. The club used to be one of the three clubs of this region that entered the Ukrainian competitions at the time of their establishment. The club soon thereafter was relegated.

Honours
Zakarpattia Oblast Football Championship
 Winners (7): 1959, 1960, 1964, 1965, 1968, 1982, 1987

League and cup history

{|class="wikitable"
|-bgcolor="#efefef"
! Season
! Div.
! Pos.
! Pl.
! W
! D
! L
! GS
! GA
! P
!Domestic Cup
!colspan=2|Europe
!Notes
|-
|align=center|1992
|align=center|3rd
|align=center|5
|align=center|16
|align=center|7
|align=center|4
|align=center|5
|align=center|23
|align=center|22
|align=center|18
|align=center bgcolor=darkgrey|
|align=center|
|align=center|
|align=center bgcolor=red|Relegated
|-
|align=center|1992–93
|align=center|4th
|align=center|12
|align=center|34
|align=center|13
|align=center|2
|align=center|19
|align=center|29
|align=center|35
|align=center|28
|align=center bgcolor=darkgrey|
|align=center|
|align=center|
|align=center|
|-
|align=center|1993–94
|align=center|4th
|align=center|12
|align=center|34
|align=center|13
|align=center|5
|align=center|16
|align=center|33
|align=center|49
|align=center|31
|align=center bgcolor=darkgrey|
|align=center|
|align=center|
|align=center|
|-
|align=center|1994–95
|align=center|4th
|align=center|21
|align=center|42
|align=center|6
|align=center|3
|align=center|33
|align=center|18
|align=center|35
|align=center|21
|align=center|Q3 round
|align=center|
|align=center|
|align=center bgcolor=red|Relegated
|}

See also
FC Karpaty Mukacheve

Rus Khust
Football clubs in Zakarpattia Oblast
Association football clubs established in 1934
1934 establishments in Ukraine